Greenfaulds High School is a mixed, non-denominational six-year comprehensive secondary school. The original building was opened in 1971, while the new building was first opened to the public on 29 September 2016, and the old building has now been demolished. Greenfaulds is situated in the west of Cumbernauld and provides a service to the Greenfaulds, Ravenswood, Condorrat, Westfield, Eastfield, Balloch, Craigmarloch areas and parts of Seafar. The Head Teacher is James Vaugh-Sharp. The current school building has a maximum capacity of 1,450 pupils, making it the largest school in the Lanarskhire area and one of the largest in Scotland. Greenfaulds has six associated primary schools, which are Baird Memorial, Condorrat, Eastfield, Ravenswood, Westfield, and Woodlands.

Facilities

Subjects 
The school teaches a wide variety of subjects, most of which are taught through first and second year. Some subjects are only taught as National 5 or Higher and above. Subjects include:

 English
 Performing Arts (Art, Music, Drama)
 Social Subjects (History, Modern Studies, Geography)
 Technical (Graphics, Design and Manufacturing, Woodworking)
 Modern Languages (French, Spanish, German, Scots Gaelic)
 Sciences (Biology, Chemistry, Psychology (16+), Environmental Science,  Physics)
 Health and Wellbeing (Home Economics, Physical Education, Personal Development)
 Computing (Computing Science, Accounting, Business Management, Admin & IT )

Activities & Events 
The school usually hosts a theatre show at both Christmas and Summer. The shows are performed by the students at the school.

Competitions are held yearly for the seven different house groups. Houses earn points through challenges, some of which are individual tasks, while others are teamwork activities. The school also hosts an award show at the end of each year. Pupils earn awards based on how many nominations they receive by their teachers (S1-S3) or based on their Prelim results (S4-S6). A guest speaker is also invited to speak at the event.

New School Building 
The new school building was opened to the public in September 2016, and the original building has been demolished. The total cost of the project, which includes the new building, as well as the sport facilities was an estimated £31.2 million. Although the building does not have a pool, it is equipped with sports facilities such as a tennis court, grass pitch, and running track. The running track contains other sport events such as long jump, javelin and discus. The sporting facilities were completed August 2017, in time for the new school year 2017–2018.

Royal visit 

 Greenfaulds High School had a visit from The Queen in June of 2019

References

External links
Greenfaulds High School's page on Parentzone.
School's web-site

Secondary schools in North Lanarkshire
Scottish Gaelic-language secondary schools
Cumbernauld
1971 establishments in Scotland
Educational institutions established in 1971
School buildings completed in 2016